The Seerenbach Falls (German: Seerenbachfälle) are a cascading set of three waterfalls near Betlis of the Amden municipality near the Walensee, Switzerland. The upper cascade has a height of 50 m, the middle one of 305 m, and the lower one of 190 m, for a total of 585 m. The waterfalls form a creek, the Seerenbach, which drains into Walensee.

The middle section (Seerenbach Fall II) is the second-highest waterfall in Switzerland, after the Mürrenbach Fall (417 m).

Rinquelle
The Rinquelle (Rin Spring), a karst spring, joins Seerenbach Fall III in the Seerenbach canyon. Behind the spring is a river cave system that was explored between 1953 and 1981. The waterfall of the Rinquelle is 48 m high.

References

Waterfalls of Switzerland
Walensee
Karst springs
Springs of Switzerland
Tourist attractions in Switzerland